Maria Fernanda Alves and Samantha Murray were the defending champions having won the previous edition in 2011, however both players chose not to participate.

Rutuja Bhosale and Hiroko Kuwata won the title, defeating Kimberly Birrell and Katy Dunne in the final, 6–2, 6–4.

Seeds

Draw

Draw

References
Main Draw

Darwin Tennis International - Doubles